The Interagency Security Classification Appeals Panel, or "ISCAP", provides the public and users of the classification system with a forum for further review of classification decisions. ISCAP states in order to foster a well-informed public while simultaneously protecting national security interests, checks and balances are needed over the classification system. This requires that some of the work of the U.S. Government be done outside the purview of its citizenry.

The ISCAP was created under Executive Order 12958, "Classified National Security Information," when it was signed on April 17, 1995 and held its first meeting in May 1996. Today the ISCAP receives its guidelines from Executive Order 13526 of December 29, 2009,  which superseded Executive Order 12958 and its amendments in full on June 25, 2010.

Functions
Section 5.3 of E.O. 13526 directs the ISCAP to perform four critical functions:
 Classification Challenges: Deciding on appeals by authorized persons who have filed classification challenges under Section 1.8 of E.O. 13526;
 Exemptions from Automatic Declassification: Approving, denying or amending agency exemptions from automatic declassification, as provided in Section 3.3 of E.O. 13526;
 Mandatory Declassification Review Appeals: Deciding on mandatory declassification review appeals by parties whose requests for declassification under Section 3.5 of E.O. 13526, have been denied at the agency level; and
 Inform Decisions: Appropriately inform senior agency officials and the public of final Panel decisions on appeals under Sections 1.8 and 3.5 of E.O. 13526.
Additionally, the ISCAP has another function under section 3.3(c)(1) of E.O. 13526.
 File Series Exemptions: Deciding on agency requests to exempt a designated file series from automatic declassification at 25 years.

Membership
The ISCAP member body consists of senior level representatives appointed by the Departments of State, Defense, and Justice, the National Archives, the Office of the Director of National Intelligence, and the National Security Advisor. Each shall be represented by a senior-level representative who is a full-time or permanent part-time Federal officer or employee designated to serve as a member of the Panel by the respective agency head. The President shall designate a Chair from among the members of the Panel. The Director of ISOO serves as its Executive Secretary, and ISOO staff provides program and administrative support for the panel. The Director of the Central Intelligence Agency may appoint a temporary representative to participate as a voting member in all Panel deliberations and associated support activities concerning classified information originated by the Central Intelligence Agency.

Goals
The Interagency Security Classification Appeals Panel (ISCAP) provides the public and users of the classification system with a forum for further review of classification decisions.  The protection of the national security requires that some of the work of the U.S. Government be done outside the purview of its citizenry. In order to ensure an informed public while simultaneously protecting certain information, checks and balances are needed over the classification system.

Members and Staff
The ISCAP is a six member body consisting of senior level representatives appointed by the Departments of State, Defense, and Justice, the Central Intelligence Agency, the National Archives, and the Assistant to the President for National Security Affairs. Each representative appoints a working level liaison to the ISCAP. The President appoints the ISCAP's Chair from among its members. The Director of ISOO serves as its Executive Secretary, and ISOO staff provides program and administrative support for the panel.

Functions
Section 5.3 of Executive Order 12958, as amended, directs the ISCAP to perform three critical functions:
 Classification Challenges: deciding on appeals by authorized persons who have filed classification challenges under Section 1.8 of Executive Order 12958, as amended;
 Exemptions from Automatic Declassification: approving, denying or amending agency exemptions from automatic declassification, as provided in Section 3.3 of Executive Order 12958, as amended; and
 Mandatory Declassification Review Appeals: deciding on mandatory declassification review appeals by parties whose requests for declassification under Section 3.5 of Executive Order 12958, as amended, have been denied at the agency level.

Bylaws
The ISCAP bylaws describe the procedures to be followed by individuals or organizations who wish to bring matters before the ISCAP, and the procedures that the ISCAP will follow to resolve these matters. The ISCAP first published its bylaws on March 15, 1996 (61 FR 10854).

The ISCAP has revised its bylaws to reflect the March 25, 2003, amendment of E.O. 12958. While intelligence sources and methods information remain subject to the jurisdiction of the ISCAP, section 5.3(f) of the amended Order recognizes the special authority and responsibility of the Director of Central Intelligence (this authority likely shifted to the newly created position of Director of National Intelligence) to protect such information.

ISCAP Bylaws

Article I. Purpose

The purpose of the Interagency Security Classification Appeals Panel (ISCAP) and these bylaws is to fulfill the functions assigned to the ISCAP by Executive Order 12958, "Classified National Security Information," as amended.

Article II. Authority

Executive Order 12958, "Classified National Security Information," as amended (hereafter the "Order"), and its implementing directives.

Article III. Membership
 A. Primary Membership. Appointments under section 5.3(a) of the Order establish the primary membership of the ISCAP.
 B. Alternate Membership.
 1. Primary members are expected to participate fully in the activities of the ISCAP. The Executive Secretary shall request that each entity represented on the ISCAP also designate in writing addressed to the Chair an alternate or alternates to represent it on all occasions when the primary member is unable to participate. Such written designation must be made by the agency or office head represented on the ISCAP, or by their deputy or senior agency official for the Order. When serving for a primary member, an alternate member shall assume all the rights and responsibilities of that primary member, including voting.
 2. When a vacancy in the primary membership occurs, the designated alternate shall represent the agency or office until the agency or office head fills the vacancy. The Chair, working through the Executive Secretary, shall take all appropriate measures to encourage the agency or office head to fill a vacancy in the primary membership as quickly as possible.
 C. Liaison. The Executive Secretary shall request that each entity represented on the ISCAP also designate to the Chair in writing an individual or individuals (hereinafter referred to as “liaisons”) to serve as a liaison to the Executive Secretary in support of the primary member and alternate(s). Such written designation must be made by the agency or office head represented on the ISCAP, or by their deputy or senior agency official for the Order. These designated individuals shall meet at the call of the Executive Secretary.
 D. Chair. As provided in section 5.3(a) of the Order, the President shall select the Chair from among the primary members.
 E. Vice Chair. The members may elect from among the primary members a Vice Chair who shall:
 1. Chair meetings that the Chair is unable to attend; and
 2. Serve as Acting Chair during a vacancy in the Chair of the ISCAP.

Article IV. Meetings
 A. Purpose. The primary purpose of ISCAP meetings is to discuss and bring formal resolution to matters before the ISCAP.
 B. Frequency. As provided in section 5.3(a) of the Order, the ISCAP shall meet at the call of the Chair, who shall schedule meetings as may be necessary for the ISCAP to fulfill its functions in a timely manner. The Chair shall also convene the ISCAP when requested by a majority of its primary members.
 C. Quorum. Meetings of the ISCAP may be held only when a quorum is present. For this purpose, a quorum requires the presence of at least five primary or alternate members.
 D. Attendance. As determined by the Chair, attendance at meetings of the ISCAP shall be limited to those persons necessary for the ISCAP to fulfill its functions in a complete and timely manner. The members may arrange briefings by substantive experts from individual departments or agencies, after consultation with the Chair.
 E. Agenda. The Chair shall establish the agenda for all meetings. Potential items for the agenda may be submitted to the Chair by any member or the Executive Secretary. Acting through the Executive Secretary, the Chair will distribute the agenda and supporting materials to the members as soon as possible before a scheduled meeting.
 F. Minutes. The Executive Secretary shall be responsible for the preparation of each meeting's minutes, and the distribution of draft minutes to each member. The minutes will include a record of the members present at the meeting and the result of each vote. At the subsequent meeting of the ISCAP, the Chair will read or reference the draft minutes of the previous meeting. At that time the minutes will be corrected, as necessary, and approved by the membership and certified by the Chair. The approved minutes will be maintained among the records of the ISCAP.

Article V. Voting
 A. Motions. When a decision or recommendation of the ISCAP is required to resolve a matter before it, the Chair shall request or accept a motion for a vote. Any member, including the Chair, may make a motion for a vote. No second shall be required to bring any motion to a vote. A quorum must be present when a vote is taken.
 B. Eligibility. Only the members, including the Chair, may vote on a motion before the ISCAP, with each agency or office represented having one vote.
 C. Voting Procedures. Votes shall ordinarily be taken and tabulated by a show of hands.
 D. Passing a Motion. In response to a motion, members may vote affirmatively, negatively, or abstain from voting. Except as otherwise provided in these bylaws, a motion passes when it receives a majority of affirmative votes of the members voting. However, in no instance will the ISCAP reverse an agency's decision without the affirmative vote of at least a majority of the members present.
 E. Votes in a Non-meeting Context. The Chair may call for a vote of the membership outside the context of a formal ISCAP meeting. An alternate member may also participate in such a vote if the primary member cannot. The Executive Secretary shall record and retain such votes in a documentary form and immediately report the results to the Chair and other primary and alternate members.

Article VI. First Function: Appeals of Agency Decisions Regarding Classification Challenges

In accordance with section 5.3(b) of the Order, the ISCAP shall decide on appeals by authorized persons who have filed classification challenges under section 1.8 of the Order.
 A. Jurisdiction. The ISCAP will consider appeals from classification challenges that otherwise meet the standards of the Order if:
 1. The appeal is filed in accordance with these bylaws;
 2. The appellant has previously challenged the classification action at the agency that originated or is otherwise responsible for the information in question in accordance with the agency's procedures or, if the agency has failed to establish procedures for classification challenges, by filing a written challenge directly with the agency head or designated senior agency official, as defined in section 6.1(ii) of the Order;
 3. The appellant has (a) Received a final agency decision denying his or her challenge; or (b) Not received (i) an initial written response to the classification challenge from the agency within 120 days of its filing, or (ii) a written response to an internal agency appeal within 90 days of the filing of the appeal;
 4. There is no action pending in the federal courts regarding the information in question; and
 5. The information in question has not been the subject of review by the federal courts or the ISCAP within the past two years.
 B. Addressing of Appeals. Appeals should be addressed to: Executive Secretary, Interagency Security Classification Appeals Panel, Attn: Classification Challenge Appeals, c/o Information Security Oversight Office, National Archives and Records Administration, 7th and Pennsylvania Avenue, NW., Room 500, Washington, DC 20408.
The appeal must contain enough information for the Executive Secretary to be able to obtain all pertinent documents about the classification challenge from the affected agency. No classified information should be included within the initial appeal document. The Executive Secretary will arrange for the transmittal of classified information from the agency after receiving the appeal. If it is impossible for the appellant to file an appeal without including classified information, prior arrangements must be made by contacting the Information Security Oversight Office.
 C. Timeliness of Appeals. An appeal to the ISCAP must be filed within 60 days of:
 1. The date of the final agency decision; or
 2. The agency's failure to meet the time frames established in paragraph (A)(3)(b) of this Article.
 D. Rejection of Appeal. If the Executive Secretary determines that the appeal does not meet the requirements of the Order or these bylaws, the Executive Secretary shall notify the appellant in writing that the appeal will not be considered by the ISCAP. The notification shall include an explanation of why the appeal is deficient.
 E. Preparation. The Executive Secretary shall notify the Chair, the designated senior agency official, and the primary member, alternate, or liaison of the affected agency(ies) when an appeal is lodged. Under the direction of the ISCAP, the Executive Secretary shall supervise the preparation of an appeal file, pertinent portions of which will be presented to the members of the ISCAP for their review prior to a vote on the appeal. The appeal file will eventually include all records pertaining to the appeal.
 F. Resolution of Appeals. The ISCAP may vote to affirm the agency's decision, to reverse the agency's decision in whole or in part, or to remand the matter to the agency for further consideration. A decision to reverse an agency's decision requires the affirmative vote of at least a majority of the members present.
 G. Notification. The Executive Secretary shall promptly notify in writing the appellant, the agency head, and designated senior agency official of the ISCAP's decision.
 H. Agency Appeals. Within 60 days of receipt of an ISCAP decision that reverses a final agency decision, the agency head may petition the President through the Assistant to the President for National Security Affairs to overrule the decision of the ISCAP.
 I. Protection of Classified Information. All persons involved in the appeal shall make every effort to minimize the inclusion of classified information in the appeal file. Any classified information contained in the appeal file shall be handled and protected in accordance with the Order and its implementing directives. Information being challenged for classification shall remain classified unless and until a final decision is made to declassify it. In no instance will the ISCAP declassify properly classified information solely because of an agency's failure to prescribe or follow appropriate procedures for handling classification challenges.
 J. Maintenance of File. The Executive Secretary shall maintain the appeal file among the records of the ISCAP.

Article VII. Second Function: Review of Agency Exemptions From Automatic Declassification

In accordance with section 5.3(b) of the Order, the ISCAP shall approve, deny or amend agency exemptions from automatic declassification as provided in section 3.3(d) of the Order.
 A. Agency Notification of Exemptions. The agency head or designated senior agency official shall notify the Executive Secretary of agency exemptions in accordance with the requirements of the Order and its implementing directives. Agencies shall provide any additional information or justification that the Executive Secretary believes is necessary or helpful in order for the ISCAP to review and decide on the exemption. The agency head may seek relief from the ISCAP from any request for information by the Executive Secretary to which the agency objects.
 B. Preparation. The Executive Secretary shall notify the Chair of the agency submission. At the direction of the ISCAP, the Executive Secretary shall supervise the preparation of an exemption file, pertinent portions of which will be presented to the members of the ISCAP for their review prior to a vote on the exemptions. The exemption file will eventually include all records pertaining to the ISCAP's consideration of the agency's exemptions.
 C. Resolution. The ISCAP may vote to approve an agency exemption, to deny an agency exemption, to amend an agency exemption, or to remand the matter to the agency for further consideration. A decision to deny or amend an agency exemption requires the affirmative vote of a majority of the members present.
 D. Notification. The Executive Secretary shall promptly notify in writing the agency head and designated senior agency official of the ISCAP's decision.
 E. Agency Appeals. Within 60 days of receipt of an ISCAP decision that denies or amends an agency exemption, the agency head may petition the President through the Assistant to the President for National Security Affairs to overrule the decision of the ISCAP.
 F. Protection of Classified Information. Any classified information contained in the exemption file shall be handled and protected in accordance with the Order and its implementing directives. Information that the agency maintains is exempt from declassification shall remain classified unless and until a final decision is made to declassify it.
 G. Maintenance of File. The Executive Secretary shall maintain the exemption file among the records of the ISCAP.

Article VIII. Third Function: Appeals of Agency Decisions Denying Declassification Under Mandatory Review Provisions of the Order

In accordance with section 5.3(b) of the Order, the ISCAP shall decide on appeals by parties whose requests for declassification under section 3.5 of the Order have been denied.
 A. Jurisdiction. The ISCAP will consider appeals from denials of mandatory review for declassification requests that otherwise meet the standards of the Order if:
 1. The appeal is filed in accordance with these bylaws;
 2. The appellant has previously filed a request for mandatory declassification review at the agency that originated or is otherwise responsible for the information in question in accordance with the agency's procedures or, if the agency has failed to establish procedures for mandatory review, by filing a written request directly with the agency head or designated senior agency official;
 3. The appellant has (a) Received a final agency decision denying his or her request; or (b) Not received (i) an initial decision on the request for mandatory declassification review from the agency within one year of its filing, or (ii) a final decision on an internal agency appeal within 180 days of the filing of the appeal;
 4. There is no action pending in the federal courts regarding the information in question; and
 5. The information in question has not been the subject of review by the federal courts or the ISCAP within the past two years.
 B. Addressing of Appeals. Appeals should be addressed to: Executive Secretary, Interagency Security Classification Appeals Panel, Attn: Mandatory Review Appeals, c/o Information Security Oversight Office, National Archives and Records Administration, 7th and Pennsylvania Avenue, NW., Room 500, Washington, DC 20408. The appeal must contain enough information for the Executive Secretary to be able to obtain all pertinent documents about the request for mandatory declassification review from the affected agency.
 C. Timeliness of Appeals. An appeal to the ISCAP must be filed within 60 days of:
 1. The date of the final agency decision; or
 2. The agency's failure to meet the time frames established in paragraph (A)(3)(b) of this Article.
 D. Rejection of Appeal. If the Executive Secretary determines that the appeal does not meet the requirements of the Order or these bylaws, the Executive Secretary shall notify the appellant in writing that the appeal will not be considered by the ISCAP. The notification shall include an explanation of why the appeal is deficient.
 E. Preparation. The Executive Secretary shall notify the Chair and the primary member, alternate, or liaison of the affected agency(ies) when an appeal is lodged. Under the direction of the ISCAP, the Executive Secretary shall supervise the preparation of an appeal file, pertinent portions of which will be presented to the members of the ISCAP for their review prior to a vote on the appeal. The appeal file will eventually include all records pertaining to the appeal.
 F. Narrowing Appeals. To expedite the resolution of appeals and minimize backlogs, the Executive Secretary is authorized to consult with appellants with the objective of narrowing or prioritizing the information subject to the appeal.
 G. Resolution of Appeals. The ISCAP may vote to affirm the agency's decision, to reverse the agency's decision in whole or in part, or to remand the matter to the agency for further consideration. A decision to reverse an agency's decision requires the affirmative vote of at least a majority of the members present.
 H. Notification. The Executive Secretary shall promptly notify in writing the appellant, the agency head, and designated senior agency official of the ISCAP's decision.
 I. Agency Appeals. Within 60 days of receipt of an ISCAP decision that reverses a final agency decision, the agency head may petition the President through the Assistant to the President for National Security Affairs to overrule the decision of the ISCAP.
 J. Protection of Classified Information. Any classified information contained in the appeal file shall be handled and protected in accordance with the Order and its implementing directives. Information that is subject to an appeal from an agency decision denying declassification under the mandatory review provisions of the Order shall remain classified unless and until a final decision is made to declassify it. In no instance will the ISCAP declassify properly classified information solely because of an agency's failure to prescribe or follow appropriate procedures for handling mandatory review for declassification requests and appeals.
 K. Maintenance of File. The Executive Secretary shall maintain the appeal file among the records of the ISCAP. All information declassified as a result of ISCAP action shall be available for inclusion within the databases delineated in section 3.7 of the Order.

Article IX. Information Owned or Controlled by the Director of Central Intelligence (DCI)

Notwithstanding any conclusion reached by the ISCAP that information owned or controlled by the DCI should be declassified, if the DCI disagrees because he or she has made a determination as set forth in section 5.3(f) of the Order, and he or she so notifies the Panel, the information shall remain classified. The Panel expects notification to normally be made in writing within 60 days of receipt of the Panel’s written notification of such a conclusion. In the event that the DCI requires additional time to provide notification to the Panel, the DCI, his or her deputy, or the DCI’s primary or alternate Panel member, shall notify the Panel, in writing, of the need for additional time, not to exceed an additional 30 days. Following receipt of the DCI's determination, the Panel, by majority vote, or an agency head represented on the Panel, may petition the President, through the Assistant to the President for National Security Affairs, to reverse the DCI's determination. Such petitions must be made within 60 days of receipt of the DCI's determination. If the Panel has not been notified of the DCI’s determination within 60 days (or if additional time is requested as outlined above, within 90 days) of the date that the DCI has been notified of the Panel’s conclusion, the information shall be declassified, pending resolution of any appeals filed pursuant to section I of Article VIII of these bylaws.

Article X. Additional Functions

In its consideration of the matters before it, the ISCAP shall perform such additional advisory functions as are consistent with and supportive of the successful implementation of the Order.

Article XI. Support Staff

As provided in section 5.3(a) of the Order, the Director of the Information Security Oversight Office will serve as Executive Secretary to the ISCAP, and the staff of the Information Security Oversight Office will provide program and administrative support for the ISCAP. The Executive Secretary will supervise the staff in this function pursuant to the direction of the Chair and ISCAP. On an as needed basis, the ISCAP may seek detailees from its member agencies to augment the staff of the Information Security Oversight Office in support of the ISCAP.

Article XII. Records
 A. Integrity of ISCAP Records. The Executive Secretary shall maintain separately documentary materials, regardless of their physical form or characteristics, that are produced by or presented to the ISCAP or its staff in the performance of the ISCAP's functions, consistent with applicable federal law.
 B. Referrals. Any Freedom of Information Act request or other access request for a document that originated within an agency other than the ISCAP shall be referred to that agency for processing.

Article XIII. Annual Reports to the President

The ISCAP has been established for the sole purpose of advising and assisting the President in the discharge of his constitutional and discretionary authority to protect the national security of the United States (section 5.3(e) of the Order). As provided in section 5.3(a) of the Order, pertinent information and data about the activities of the ISCAP shall be included in the Reports to the President issued by the Information Security Oversight Office. The Chair, in coordination with the other members of the ISCAP and the Executive Secretary, shall determine what information and data to include in each Report.

Article XIV. Approval, Amendment, and Publication of Bylaws

The approval and amendment of these bylaws shall require the affirmative vote of at least four of the ISCAP's members. In accordance with the Order, the Executive Secretary shall submit the approved bylaws and their amendments for publication in the Federal Register. -->

Statistical Information

For statistical information please verify the ISOO Annual Reports section on ISCAP.

See also
 National Archives and Records Administration
 Mandatory Declassification Review
 Information Security Oversight Office
 Public Interest Declassification Board
 Commission consultative du secret de la défense nationale
 Controlled Unclassified Information
 United States National Security Council

References

External links
 Official site
 ISCAP Mandatory Declassification Review Appeals
 ISCAP Releases - National Archives
 ISCAP  Project on Government Secrecy - Federation of American Scientists
 ISCAP Bylaws, Rules, and Appeal Procedures

Establishments by United States executive order
1995 establishments in the United States